Acrocinini is a tribe of longhorn beetles of the subfamily Lamiinae.

Taxonomy
Acrocinus Illiger, 1806
Macropophora Thomson, 1864
Oreodera Audinet-Serville, 1835

References

Lamiinae
Beetle tribes